"Professional Griefers" is a song by Canadian electronic music producer Deadmau5 featuring vocals by American singer Gerard Way. The song was released as the third single from his sixth studio album Album Title Goes Here. The song is featured in the game FIFA 13 and its soundtrack. The song used to be featured in the game Asphalt 8: Airborne in the electronica playlist. The song was also featured briefly in season one episode five of the hit TV show Arrow.

Background
"Professional Griefers" was first previewed as an unreleased instrumental on Deadmau5's Ustream channel as a work in progress on February 13, 2011. The instrumental made its live debut during deadmau5's Meowingtons Hax tour mixed with Daft Punk's 2001 song Harder, Better, Faster, Stronger, premiering the track at his critically acclaimed headlining performance at Lollapalooza. The vocal version of "Professional Griefers", with Gerard Way, starts with hard beats and heavily distorted guitar stabs, then builds tension with discordant synth strikes leading into the chorus.

In early 2012, when Zimmerman was asked why he was waiting to release it, he replied "[he was] going to do something big with it". That July, he spread the word that there was going to be a video shoot, and that he needed approximately 2,000 fans to arrive at the scene.

Release
In late 2011 and early 2012, only live recordings of "Professional Griefers" as an instrumental could be found floating around the Internet. On November 18, 2011, the instrumental version of the track was played during the official launch of Minecraft. As early as December 2011, Zimmerman began playing the track along with vocals via live Internet stream. Due to Gerard Way's distinctive voice, fans were able to discern it was him. Then on July 6, 2012, a preview of the track was uploaded to the official deadmau5 YouTube channel. Finally on August 14, 2012, "Professional Griefers" was released on Beatport and iTunes.

"Professional Griefers" was released on Deadmau5's album Album Title Goes Here, including a vocal mix, radio edit, and a music video.

Music video 
The video, featuring both Deadmau5 and Gerard Way, was directed by Paul Boyd and Jeff Ranasinghe and produced by Dave Stewart's Weapons of Mass Entertainment production company. It debuted on August 29, 2012 via Ultra's YouTube channel. It is the most expensive electronic dance music video to date. 

The video begins near a trailer home whose residents are watching Zimmerman and Gerard battle with giant robotic mice at a UFC match inside a dome (a reference to the Thunderdome from the Mad Max franchise), with a crowd watching (consisting of the aforementioned 2000 fans). Throughout the video, it cuts to various people watching the match on TV. While Gerard is dominating the battle, a robotic version of "Meowingtons", Zimmerman's cat, enters and chews the wires to Gerard's controls. This renders Gerard's robot idle, which allows Zimmerman to win the match. But immediately after, the robotic cat assumes control of Zimmerman's beaten-up robot, causing it to stumble and fall into the dome, crushing it, as everyone inside flees. The video ends with the robotic cat standing on some debris, gazing into the camera, before pouncing on it.

Track listing

Chart performance
.

References

2012 singles
Deadmau5 songs
2011 songs
Songs written by Deadmau5
Songs written by Gerard Way
Ultra Music singles
electronic rock songs
Music videos directed by Paul Boyd